Ilmen is a rural locality (a selo) in Mazurskoye Rural Settlement, Povorinsky District, Voronezh Oblast, Russia. The population was 390 as of 2010. There are 5 streets.

Geography 
Ilmen is located 37 km northeast of Povorino (the district's administrative centre) by road. Mazurka is the nearest rural locality.

References 

Rural localities in Povorinsky District